Adipic acid or hexanedioic acid is the organic compound with the formula (CH2)4(COOH)2. From an industrial perspective, it is the most important dicarboxylic acid: about 2.5 billion kilograms of this white crystalline powder are produced annually, mainly as a precursor for the production of nylon. Adipic acid otherwise rarely occurs in nature, but it is known as manufactured E number food additive E355. Salts and esters of adipic acid are known as adipates.

Preparation and reactivity
Adipic acid is produced from a mixture of cyclohexanone and cyclohexanol called KA oil, the abbreviation of ketone-alcohol oil. The KA oil is oxidized with nitric acid to give adipic acid, via a multistep pathway. Early in the reaction, the cyclohexanol is converted to the ketone, releasing nitrous acid:
HOC6H11  +  HNO3  →  OC(CH2)5  +  HNO2  +  H2O
Among its many reactions, the cyclohexanone is nitrosated, setting the stage for the scission of the C-C bond:
HNO2  +  HNO3  →  NO+NO3−  +  H2O
OC6H10  +  NO+  →  OC6H9-2-NO  +  H+
Side products of the method include glutaric and succinic acids. Nitrous oxide is produced in about one to one mole ratio to the adipic acid, as well, via the intermediacy of a nitrolic acid.

Related processes start from cyclohexanol, which is obtained from the hydrogenation of phenol.

Alternative methods of production
Several methods have been developed by carbonylation of butadiene. For example, the hydrocarboxylation proceeds as follows:
CH2=CH−CH=CH2  +  2 CO  +  2 H2O   →  HO2C(CH2)4CO2H

Another method is oxidative cleavage of cyclohexene using hydrogen peroxide. The waste product is water.

Historically, adipic acid was prepared by oxidation of various fats, thus the name (ultimately from Latin adeps, adipis – "animal fat"; cf. adipose tissue).

Reactions
Adipic acid is a dibasic acid (it has two acidic groups). The pKa values for their successive deprotonations are 4.41 and 5.41.

With the carboxylate groups separated by four methylene groups, adipic acid is suited for intramolecular condensation reactions. Upon treatment with barium hydroxide at elevated temperatures, it undergoes ketonization to give cyclopentanone.

Uses
About 60% of the 2.5 billion kg of adipic acid produced annually is used as monomer for the production of nylon by a polycondensation reaction with hexamethylene diamine forming nylon 66. Other major applications also involve polymers; it is a monomer for production of polyurethane and its esters are plasticizers, especially in PVC.

In medicine
Adipic acid has been incorporated into controlled-release formulation matrix tablets to obtain pH-independent release for both weakly basic and weakly acidic drugs. It has also been incorporated into the polymeric coating of hydrophilic monolithic systems to modulate the intragel pH, resulting in zero-order release of a hydrophilic drug. The disintegration at intestinal pH of the enteric polymer shellac has been reported to improve when adipic acid was used as a pore-forming agent without affecting release in
the acidic media. Other controlled-release formulations have included adipic acid with the intention of obtaining a late-burst release profile.

In foods
Small but significant amounts of adipic acid are used as a food ingredient as a flavorant and gelling aid. It is used in some calcium carbonate antacids to make them tart. As an acidulant in baking powders, it avoids the undesirable hygroscopic properties of tartaric acid. Adipic acid, rare in nature, does occur naturally in beets, but this is not an economical source for commerce compared to industrial synthesis.

Safety
Adipic acid, like most carboxylic acids, is a mild skin irritant. It is mildly toxic, with a median lethal dose of 3600 mg/kg for oral ingestion by rats.

Environmental
At adipic acid producers DuPont and Rhodia (now Invista and Solvay, respectively), processes have been implemented to catalytically convert the nitrous oxide to innocuous products:
2 N2O  →  2 N2  +  O2

Adipate salts and esters

The anionic (HO2C(CH2)4CO2−) and dianionic (−O2C(CH2)4CO2−) forms of adipic acid are referred to as adipates. An adipate compound is a carboxylate salt or ester of the acid.

Some adipate salts are used as acidity regulators, including:

 Sodium adipate (E number E356)
 Potassium adipate (E357)

Some adipate esters are used as plasticizers, including:

 Bis(2-ethylhexyl) adipate
 Dioctyl adipate
 Dimethyl adipate

References

Appendix
U.S. FDA citations – GRAS (21 CFR 184.1009), Indirect additive (21 CFR 175.300, 21 CFR 175.320, 21 CFR 176.170, 21 CFR 176.180, 21 CFR 177.1200, 21 CFR 177.1390, 21 CFR 177.1500, 21 CFR 177.1630, 21 CFR 177.1680, 21 CFR 177.2420, 21 CFR 177.2600)
 European Union Citations – Decision 1999/217/EC – Flavoing Substance; Directive 95/2/EC, Annex IV – Permitted Food Additive; 2002/72/EC, Annex A – Authorized monomer for Food Contact Plastics

External links

adipic acid on chemicalland

Commodity chemicals
Dicarboxylic acids
Food acidity regulators
Monomers
E-number additives